Wrightsboro Road is a  major road in the east-central part of the U.S. state of Georgia, traveling through the northwestern part of McDuffie County, the extreme northern part of Warren County, the southeastern part of Wilkes County, the southern part of Columbia County, and the northeastern part of Richmond County.

It consists of two disconnected segments. The western segment, which is a north–south highway, extends  from Georgia State Route 17 (SR 17) and the northern terminus of Harrison Road in Thomson to US 78/SR 10/SR 17 southeast of Washington. This is also the northern terminus of SR 80. The eastern segment, which is an east–west highway, extends  from SR 223 and Hinton Wilson Road east-northeast of Thomson to James Brown Boulevard in Augusta. Even though Georgia does not sign its county highways, except for on green street signs, the western segment's McDuffie County portion is McDuffie County Route 308 (CR 308); the eastern segment's Columbia County portion is Columbia CR 571.

The western segment is mostly a rural highway. In fact, some of its path is a dirt road. Except for the northern part of SR 80 between Cadley and Washington, it is an unnumbered highway. At the western end of the eastern segment, it is also fairly rural, but at its eastern end, it is an urban corridor of the Augusta metropolitan area. It connects rural areas of southwestern Columbia County with Grovetown and Augusta. It also serves as the main entry point to Augusta Mall. From its western terminus, east-northeast of Thomson, to Grovetown, it is signed as part of SR 223. In Grovetown, it is signed as part of SR 388. East of Grovetown, it is an unnumbered highway.

It was named after Wrightsboro, a settlement formed in 1768 by British Royal Governor James Wright. It was a settlement for displaced Quakers from North Carolina. Later, Thomson, Dearing, and Wrightsboro were merged with parts of Warren County to form McDuffie County.

Route description

Western segment
McDuffie County
Wrightsboro Road begins at an intersection with SR 17 (Washington Road) in the north-central part of Thomson, in the central part of McDuffie County. This intersection is also the northern terminus of Harrison Road. It travels to the west-northwest and immediately curves to the north-northwest. It then leaves the city limits of Thomson. Just south of an intersection with the eastern terminus of Ridgeview Drive, the highway begins a curve to the north-northeast. Just north of an intersection with the western terminus of Daniel Place (CR 200), it travels over, but does not have an interchange with Interstate 20 (I-20). Immediately, Wrightsboro Road curves back to the north-northwest. North of an intersection with the western terminus of Knox Rivers Road NW (CR 20), it curves to the west-northwest. It then crosses over Mattox Creek. Just south of an intersection with the northern terminus of 3 Points Road (CR 021), the highway curves to the north. Just south of an intersection with the western terminus of Stagecoach Road, it begins to curve to the west-northwest. It crosses over Middle Creek. It then travels through Wrightsboro and then curves to the northwest. Northwest of an intersection with Ridge Road, the highway crosses over Hart Creek. It crosses over Factory Creek and then curves to the north-northwest. North of an intersection with the eastern terminus of Giles Road, it curves back to the northwest. It then intersects SR 80 on the McDuffie–Warren county line. SR 80 and Wrightsboro Road travel concurrently to the north-northeast, briefly on the county line. Almost immediately, they enter the extreme northern part of Warren County.

Warren and Wilkes counties
During this short piece, they curve to the north-northeast. Then, they briefly travel on the Warren–McDuffie county line. At a crossing of Little River Creek, they enter the southeastern part of Wilkes County. Immediately, they curve to the northwest and begin paralleling Cedar Creek. Just south of an intersection with the northern terminus of Macedonia Church Road, they curve to the north-northwest. South of an intersection with the western terminus of Big Cedar Road (CR 197), the creek ends. They curve to the north-northeast and cross over Rocky Creek. Immediately, they curve back to the north-northwest. Approximately  later, they both reach their northern terminus, an intersection with US 78/SR 10/SR 17 (Thomson Road).

Eastern segment
Columbia County

Wrightsboro Road resumes at an intersection with Georgia State Route 223 (SR 223) and the northern terminus of Hinton Wilson Road, east-northeast of Thomson, in Columbia County. West-northwest of this intersection, SR 223 has the local name of East White Oak Road. At this intersection, SR 223 assumes Wrightsboro Road as its local street name. They then cross over Kiokee Creek and have a slight northward jog before continuing to the southeast. Approximately  later, they intersect US 221/SR 47 (Appling–Harlem Road) at a roundabout. SR 223/Wrightsboro Road then curve to a more east-southeasterly routing and cross over Little Kiokee Creek. Then, they travel just south of Euchee Creek Elementary School and Euchee Creek Library. A short distance later, the roadway crosses over the northern terminus of the Grovetown Trails at Euchee Creek and the creek itself, briefly skirting along the northwestern city limits of Grovetown in the process. A few hundred feet later, the road crosses into Grovetown proper and has an intersection with the eastern terminus of Harlem–Grovetown Road. This intersection also marks the southern terminus of SR 388, which takes on the Wrightsboro Road name, while SR 223 continues to the southeast, known as East Robinson Avenue. SR 388 (Wrightsboro Road) travel to the left and in a northeasterly direction, before curving to the east. Along the way, the roadway is lined with numerous retail businesses on both sides of the road. They also travel along the southeastern edge of Goodale Park. At an intersection with the northern terminus of Katherine Street, SR 388 splits off to the north-northeast, onto the southern end of Horizon South Parkway, while Wrightsboro Road continues to the east. It leaves the city limits just before passing by the Grovetown post office. Then, it transitions into more of a residential roadway and begins to gradually turn to the northeast. Just to the east of Bellevue Memorial Gardens, a cemetery, it curves back to the east-southeast and intersects SR 383 (Jimmie Dyess Parkway). Immediately after this intersection, the road enters Richmond County and the city limits of Augusta.

Richmond County

As soon as the road travels through the SR 383 intersection, it curves to the south-southeast and immediately curves to an easterly direction. It travels north of Sue Reynolds Elementary School and then makes a gradual curve to the southeast. At the eastern terminus of Belair Road, Wrightsboro Road curves to the east-northeast and transitions into a more business-oriented roadway. It has an intersection with the southern terminus of Augusta West Parkway, which serves as a frontage road for the western side of Interstate 520 (I-520; Bobby Jones Expressway), and the northern terminus of Barton Chapel Road. After that intersection, Wrightsboro Road has an interchange with the Interstate highway itself. Immediately after this interchange are two entrance roads to Augusta Mall. An intersection with the southern terminus of Marks Church Road, which serves as a frontage road for the east side of I-520, as well as the northern terminus of Garden Spring Lane, which also leads to the mall, is next. Just after this intersection, is an intersection with Capps Road, which is the last road off Wrightsboro Road to lead to the mall. From I-520, Wrightsboro Road is lined with businesses on both sides of the highway. At the intersection with the northern terminus of North Leg Road and the southern terminus of Jackson Road, Wrightsboro Road travels just south of Copeland Elementary School. Three blocks later, it skirts along the southern edge of Augusta University's (AU) Forest Hills campus and Forest Hills Golf Club. Then, it skirts along the northern edge of the Augusta Municipal Golf Course and Daniel Field, a public use airport. Just past Daniel Field, Wrightsboro Road travels between AU's Summerville campus and the Charlie Norwood VA Medical Center. The roadway skirts along the southern edge of Monte Sano Elementary School. It travels just south of Paine College. On the southwest corner of AU's main campus, Wrightsboro Road travels under, but does not have an intersection with, SR 4 (15th Street), although there is a ramp that leads to Wrightsboro Road. It then crosses over some railroad tracks of CSX and curves to the southeast, passing just to the southwest of Lucy Craft Laney High School, C. T. Walker Traditional Magnet School, and A. R. Johnson Health Science and Engineering Magnet High School. Just over  later, the roadway meets its eastern terminus, at an intersection with James Brown Boulevard, just north of that road's southern terminus at Twiggs Street and Nicholas Street.

National Highway System
The only portion of Wrightsboro Road that is part of the National Highway System, a system of routes determined to be the most important for the nation's economy, mobility, and defense, are as follows:
 From just east of SR 223's intersection with Chamblin Road, in the northwestern part of Grovetown, to the SR 4 overpass in Augusta.

History

From the 1770s to mid 1780s, the western segment of Wrightsboro Road was constructed. from 1787 to early 1790s, the final segment of the road was constructed. In 1916, the Augusta fire of 1916 damaged some parts of the arterial street and was rebuilt. In 1966, Wrightsboro Road served the eastern terminus of SR 232/Bobby Jones Expressway until the 1970s. In the fall of 2012, Reeves Construction Company of Macon was awarded a contract to widen Wrightsboro Road from two to four lanes between Jimmie Dyess Parkway and I-520. This was partially done to protect Flowing Wells Spring, a historic spring that was built to provide water to Sue Reynolds Elementary School. In 2016, the Georgia Department of Transportation decided to transform the I-520 interchange to a contraflow left diamond interchange but the project was canceled, so construction started in the spring of 2019.

Major intersections

See also

References

External links
 Pictures near Wrightsboro Road on Geoview.info

Streets and parkways in the Augusta metropolitan area
Transportation in McDuffie County, Georgia
Transportation in Warren County, Georgia
Transportation in Wilkes County, Georgia
Transportation in Columbia County, Georgia
Transportation in Richmond County, Georgia
Grovetown, Georgia